Mickaël David Alphonse (born 12 July 1989) is a professional footballer who plays as a right-back for  club Ajaccio. Born in metropolitan France, he represents Guadeloupe at international level.

Club career
Alphonse started his career with CS Louhans-Cuiseaux and made his senior debut on 7 September 2007 in the 2–2 draw with Pau FC, coming on as a second-half substitute for Hicham Elouaari. He went on to make 58 league appearances for the club, scoring eight times.

In the summer of 2010, he transferring to FC Rouen. The following year Alphonse switched clubs again, this time joining Championnat de France Amateur side AS Moulins. He went on to spend two seasons with the club, playing almost 50 games in all competitions.

Alphonse signed for Bourg-Péronnas ahead of the 2013–14 campaign and in his second season with the club he was part of the side that finished third in the Championnat National and thereby earned promotion to Ligue 2 for the first time in the team's history.

In July 2016, Alphone signed a two-year contract with Ligue 2 club FC Sochaux Montbeliard.

In July 2018, he signed a three-year contract for Ligue 1 side Dijon.

In 21 August 2020, he became an Amiens player.

In 3 February 2022, he signed for a one-year contract with the Israeli Primer League Maccabi Haifa.

On 1 July 2022, Alphonse returned to France and signed a two-year deal with Ajaccio.

International career
Alphonse was born in France and is of Guadeloupean descent. He made his debut for the Guadeloupe national team in a 3–0 2019–20 CONCACAF Nations League qualifying win over Saint Martin on 11 September 2018.

Career statistics

Honours 
Maccabi Haifa
 Israeli Premier League: 2021–22

References

External links
 Mickaël Alphonse at foot-national.com
 
 

Living people
1989 births
People from Champigny-sur-Marne
French people of Guadeloupean descent
Footballers from Val-de-Marne
Guadeloupean footballers
French footballers
Association football defenders
Guadeloupe international footballers
2021 CONCACAF Gold Cup players
Ligue 1 players
Ligue 2 players
Championnat National players
Championnat National 2 players
Israeli Premier League players
Louhans-Cuiseaux FC players
FC Rouen players
AS Moulins players
Football Bourg-en-Bresse Péronnas 01 players
FC Sochaux-Montbéliard players
Dijon FCO players
Amiens SC players
Maccabi Haifa F.C. players
AC Ajaccio players
Guadeloupean expatriate footballers
Guadeloupean expatriate sportspeople in Israel
Expatriate footballers in Israel
Black French sportspeople